Clara Basiana Cañellas (born 23 January 1991 in Barcelona) is a Spanish competitor in synchronized swimming since 2009. She won a bronze medal in the team competition at the 2012 Summer Olympics.  Her mother, Antonia Cañellas, was also a national champion in synchronised swimming.  Basiana Cañellas retired in 2016, after Spain did not qualify for the Olympics.

Career 
Under 15

2006 SEVILLA Co.me.n Cup: silver medal TEAM, gold medal COMBO.

Junior

2007 CALELLA European Championships: silver medal TEAM and COMBO.

2008 ANGERS European Championships: silver medal TEAM and COMBO. SAINT PETERSBOURG World Championships: 7th COMBO and 6th TEAM.

2009 GLOUCESTER European Championships: bronze medal TEAM and COMBO, silver medal DUET.

Senior

2009 ROME World Championships: gold medal COMBO.

2010 BUDAPEST European Championships: silver medal TEAM and COMBO.

2011 SHANGHAI World Championships: bronze medal TEAM TECH and TEAM FREE.

2012 LONDON Olympic Games: bronze medal TEAM. EINDHOVEN European Championships: gold medal TEAM and COMBO.

2013 BARCELONA World Championships: silver medal TEAM TECH, TEAM FREE and COMBO.

2014 BERLIN European Championships

Post-career and controversy

While serving as television commentator for an Olympic qualifying event, Basiana said the Israeli team's presence in the competition "is another strategy for whitewash the genocide and violations of human rights that they're committing against the Palestinian people. [...] We've seen it repeatedly in Eurovision, and it’s as though the war crimes of the State of Israel are erased and we’d like to point this out to the viewers so as not to normalize it."

Basiana was praised in some quarters for speaking "truth" about Israeli human rights violations, while others argued that she improperly conflated politics and sport and that imputing Israeli governmental policies to Israeli athletes was equivalent to associating Basiana, a former Spanish national team member, with abusive Spanish practices in Catalonia. Critics also observed that Basiana gave no comment on the human rights issues surrounding the second-place Belarusian team, even though the tournament occurred shortly after Belarus' high-profile hijacking of Ryanair Flight 4978.

Notes

References

External links 
 

1991 births
Living people
Spanish synchronized swimmers
Olympic synchronized swimmers of Spain
Olympic medalists in synchronized swimming
Olympic bronze medalists for Spain
Synchronized swimmers at the 2012 Summer Olympics
Medalists at the 2012 Summer Olympics
World Aquatics Championships medalists in synchronised swimming
Synchronized swimmers at the 2009 World Aquatics Championships
Synchronized swimmers at the 2011 World Aquatics Championships
Synchronized swimmers at the 2013 World Aquatics Championships
Synchronized swimmers at the 2015 World Aquatics Championships
European Aquatics Championships medalists in synchronised swimming
Swimmers from Barcelona